Acanthosaura phongdienensis is a species of agamid lizard. It is endemic to central Vietnam. It is known from Phong Dien Nature Reserve in the Thua Thien-Hue Province. Adult males measure  and adult females  in snout–vent length; the tail is long.

References

phongdienensis
Reptiles of Vietnam
Endemic fauna of Vietnam
Reptiles described in 2019
Taxa named by Sang Ngoc Nguyen
Taxa named by Jin Jie-Qiong
Taxa named by Luan Thanh Nguyen
Taxa named by Che Jing
Taxa named by Robert W. Murphy